Antoinette Lucas (born October 27, 1968) is a former field hockey midfielder from the United States, who was a member of the US women's team that finished fifth at the 1996 Summer Olympics in Atlanta, Georgia. She attended Northwestern University, where she played for the Wildcats.

References

External links
 
 USA Field Hockey
 

1968 births
Living people
American female field hockey players
Northwestern Wildcats field hockey players
Olympic field hockey players of the United States
Field hockey players at the 1996 Summer Olympics
People from Goochland County, Virginia
20th-century American women